is the 16th single by Japanese idol group AKB48, released on May 26, 2010.

Promotion
The covers and music videos of the single were shot in Guam.

The first editions of the single came with a ticket to vote for the featuring members of AKB48's 17th single, "Heavy Rotation", released in August 2010. The b-side, "Majijo Teppen Blues", is the theme song of Majisuka Gakuen 2

Chart performance
The single sold 354,000 copies on its first day of release. It sold 513,000 copies on its first week of sale, making it the biggest first week for a female idol group since Morning Musume's "Ren'ai Revolution 21" in 2000, and the biggest first week sales for a female artist since Hikaru Utada's "Can You Keep a Secret?" in 2001. It also became the biggest selling AKB48 single on the week it was released, beating the group's previous single "Sakura no Shiori"'s first week sales of 318,000 copies (and its total sales of 404,000).

Track listing

Personnel

Ponytail to Shushu

Centers: Atsuko Maeda and Minami Takahashi
Team A: Haruna Kojima, Atsuko Maeda, Mariko Shinoda, Aki Takajō, Minami Takahashi
Team K: Tomomi Itano, Minami Minegishi, Sae Miyazawa, Erena Ono, Yuko Oshima
Team B: Tomomi Kasai, Yuki Kashiwagi, Rie Kitahara, Miho Miyazaki, Mayu Watanabe.
SKE48 Team S: Jurina Matsui

Nusumareta Kuchibiru
 Performed by Under Girls.
Centers: Ami Maeda and Rena Matsui
Team A: Haruka Katayama, Asuka Kuramochi, Misaki Iwasa, Ami Maeda, Aika Ōta, Rino Sashihara
Team K: Sayaka Akimoto, Reina Fujie, Ayaka Kikuchi, Moeno Nitō
Team B: Mika Komori, Manami Oku, Amina Satō, Sumire Satō
SKE48 team S: Rena Matsui, Kumi Yagami

Boku no Yell

Team A: Natsumi Matsubara, Haruka Nakagawa, Chisato Nakata, Sayaka Nakaya, Shizuka Ōya
Team K: Sakiko Matsui, Tomomi Nakatsuka, Misato Nonaka, Miku Tanabe, Mayumi Uchida, Ayaka Umeda, Rumi Yonezawa
Team B: Rina Chikano, Natsumi Hirajima, Haruka Ishida, Kana Kobayashi, Yuka Masuda, Natsuki Sato, Mariya Suzuki
Team Research Students: Sara Fujimoto, Atsuki Ishiguro, Momoko Kinumoto, Anna Mori, Mariya Nagao, Mariko Nakamura, Mina Ōba, Yuriko Sano, Haruka Shimazaki, Haruka Shimada, Eri Takamatsu, Miyu Takeuchi, Asaka Ueki, Suzuran Yamauchi, Yui Yokoyama

Majijo Teppen Blues

Team A: Haruna Kojima, Asuka Kuramochi, Atsuko Maeda, Ami Maeda, Aika Ōta, Rino Sashihara, Mariko Shinoda, Aki Takajō, Minami Takahashi
Team K: Sayaka Akimoto, Tomomi Itano, Sae Miyazawa, Moeno Nitō, Yūko Ōshima, Erena Ono
Team B: Tomomi Kasai, Yuki Kashiwagi, Rie Kitahara, Komori, Miho Miyazaki, Manami Oku, Mayu Watanabe.
SKE48 team S: Jurina Matsui, Rena Matsui
SDN48: Nachu

Charts

Sales and certifications

Notes

References 

2010 singles
AKB48 songs
Songs with lyrics by Yasushi Akimoto
Oricon Weekly number-one singles
Billboard Japan Hot 100 number-one singles
King Records (Japan) singles
2010 songs